The Nabakrushna Choudhury Centre for Development Studies is a public policy think-tank of the state of Odisha. It conducts research in the disciplines of Economics, Sociology and Social Anthropology. It is jointly funded by the Government of India and the Government of Odisha.  It assists the Odisha Government in research, planning, training.

References 

Think tanks
Think tanks based in India
Think tanks established in 1987